, formerly , is a Japanese video game developer founded on June 30, 2000, in Tokyo, Japan. They previously developed games in partnership with Nintendo subsidiary 1-Up Studio. On February 1, 2013, the company ended their co-development efforts with Nintendo due to a change in internal structure and publicized the change with a celebration of Brownie Brown's 12 years of games in the June 2013 issue of Nintendo Dream. Brownies has been developing their own titles outside of Nintendo since the separation from 1-Up Studio.

History 

The company consists of many ex-Square Co., Ltd. 2D artists. At least two of its founders (Kameoka Shinichi and Kouji Tsuda) had previously worked on the award-winning Mana series on the Game Boy and Super NES platforms. The founders left Square due to "differing ideals."

The company's first original creation was the Japan-only Magical Vacation for the Game Boy Advance, which was released in 2001. Another popular title developed by Brownie Brown was Sword of Mana, which was created for and published by Square Enix. Thought to be a new title in the Seiken Densetsu series, it was actually an enhanced remake of the first game in the series, Seiken Densetsu: Final Fantasy Gaiden (known as Mystic Quest in Europe and Final Fantasy Adventure in North America).

The company has also been credited with the development of Mother 3 in a collaborative effort with Shigesato Itoi and HAL Laboratory for the Game Boy Advance, and Magical Starsign (Magical Vacation: When the Five Stars Align in Japan) for the Nintendo DS. Brownie Brown expressed interest in a Nintendo DS port of Mother 3 if Nintendo asked them to make it, and that they would like it to be enjoyed by fans abroad.

While the company has only released video games for Nintendo's handheld video game systems up to this point, the company had previously announced a title for the GameCube, named Gofuku, which was scheduled for release in 2005 and was announced alongside Magical Vacation:  When the Five Stars Align.

The company later released Blue Dragon Plus for the Nintendo DS, developed alongside Mistwalker, and entered into the downloadable games market in 2009 with A Kappa's Trail, a DSiWare game. Brownie Brown also worked on the DS title Livly Garden, based on a browser game from So-net Entertainment, released in Japan on January 28, 2010, and aided in the development of two Level-5 titles, Professor Layton's London Life, a bonus game included with Professor Layton and the Last Specter, and Fantasy Life, for the DS and 3DS respectively.

On February 1, 2013, the company announced on their original official website that, as a result of their recent development cooperation efforts with Nintendo, Brownie Brown had undergone changes in internal structure, which included officially changing the name of their company to 1-Up Studio. They later publicized the change with a celebration of Brownie Brown's 12 years of games in the June 2013 issue of Nintendo Dream that 1-Up Studio was a partnership with Brownies and that the two would be separating. Brownies has been independently developing video games since the end of the partnership.

Games developed

as Brownie Brown (in partnership with 1-Up Studio)

as Brownies

Notes

References

External links
Official website 

Brownie Brown games
Video game companies established in 2000
Video game development companies
Video game companies of Japan
Japanese companies established in 2000